The West Michigan Grand Prix was a weekend of professional auto racing held at the Scott Brayton Memorial Street Circuit in Grand Rapids, Michigan. The first edition was held in 1998 and the final edition in 1999. The Grand Prix was sanctioned by SCCA Pro Racing.

History
The West Michigan Grand Prix was first announced in 1997 by SCCA Pro Racing. As part of the promotion of the event three Trans-Am Series cars raced down Fulton Street. A Ford Mustang Cobra, Oldsmobile Cutlass and Chevrolet Camaro passed Grand Rapids mayor John H. Logie waving the green flag. Alan Wilson designed the 13-turn track named after late IndyCar Series driver Scott Brayton. Brayton suffered a deadly crash during Indy 500 practice in 1996. Before the inaugural Grand Prix weekend official pre parties were held at the Grand Rapids Art Museum and Van Andel Museum Center. The Trans-Am Series was the headline event of both West Michigan Grand Prix editions. The first edition saw 31 Trans-Am cars take the green flag. Bill Saunders won the race with a margin of victory of over 44 seconds. The largest field was that of the SCCA Spec Racer Ford Pro Series in 1999. 40 cars participated in the race. The fastest overall racelap was set by Todd Snyder in the 1999 Barber Dodge Pro Series. Snyder passed polesitter Sepp Koster for the lead on lap 17. Koster left a gap coming out of turn one and Snyder could pass him for the lead.

Without backing from a major corporate sponsor the Grand Prix folded after 1999. Despite attracting more than 100,000 racefans both years, there were also complaints about the noise and the large number of streets which were closed. The track is now home to the Grand Cycling Classic, an event part of the United States National Criterium Championships.

Winners

Trans-Am

World Challenge T1/GT

World Challenge T2/TC

Barber Dodge Pro Series

Spec Racer Ford Pro Series

Keller Ford Vintage Grand Prix Race

References

External links
 Official website (archived)

Motorsport in Michigan
Motorsport venues in Michigan
Sports venues completed in 1998
1998 establishments in Michigan
Sports Car Club of America